Now What may refer to:

 Now What (Lisa Marie Presley album), a 2005 album by Lisa Marie Presley
 Now What (horse), racehorse
 "Now What?" (House), an episode of House
 Now What?!, a 2013 album by Deep Purple
 Now What?, a 1995 film by Tony Gardner
 Now What with Ryan Duffy, a documentary series by Huffington Post 
 MTV's Now What, an MTV television series

See also
 "What Now", NZ TV series